Michael "Ffish" Hemschoot (born 1972, Aurora, Colorado) is a director, animator and has held a variety of roles as a visual effects artist in major Hollywood films. Since 1996, Hemschoot has worked on films such as Mars Attacks!, What Dreams May Come, The Matrix, Hollow Man, Black Hawk Down, Minority Report and National Treasure.

He was lead animator on the films Bless the Child Master and Commander: The Far Side of the World, which was nominated for Best Visual Effects at the 76th Academy Awards. Currently, he is CEO at the animation studio he founded, Worker Studio, and is also a partner in the live action production company, Travelin' Productions.

Early life and education
Hemschoot was raised in Parker, Colorado, but moved to California, where he attended California Institute of the Arts (CalArts) in the early 1990s and graduated from their Character Animation program in 1995.

Career

Teaching and early films
He has worked with visual effects companies such as Warner Digital Studios, Creative Visual Effects, Inc., Manex Visual Effects and Asylum Visual Effects. After his relocation to Colorado, Hemschoot was an adjunct professor of animation at Rocky Mountain College of Art and Design.

He started his career in film in 1996 when he was "2D roto artist" for Warner Digital Studios on Mars Attacks!. He then was an animator in a number of late 1990s films. In the 1997 film Batman & Robin, he was the digital compositor. He had the same role in the 1998 film What Dreams May Come. In 1999, he was also a character animator on The Matrix through Manex Visual Effects.

Among other roles in the early 2000s, he was a CG artist for the 2001 movie Black Hawk Down. After serving as lead animator for the 2003 film Master and Commander, in 2004, he was an animator for National Treasure. He was the lead animator for the feature film Sky High in 2005.

Recent productions
As producing, directing and writing partners, Hemschoot and actor Sean Bridgers formed the live-action production company called Travelin Productions, as well as an animation and visual effects company, Worker Studio.  They soon completed two short films together: A Night at the Zoo in 2008, starring W. Earl Brown and Bridgers, then The Birthday Present in 2012, starring Joey Lauren Adams. He first collaborated as a director with director Sean Bridgers on the short film A Night in the Zoo, which was nominated for Best Short at the Little Rock Film Festival, where it premiered in 2009. He and Bridgers co-directed the 2012 short film The Birthday Present, which screened at the Little Rock Film Festival, Oxford Film Festival, and others.

For the 2012 film The ABCs of Death, he served as visual effects supervisor for the "E" segment. Sean Bridgers and Hemschoot also developed a live action feature film that is a dark western set during the Civil War in the South, titled Arkansas Traveler. Cast attached to the project included Garret Dillahunt and Angela Bettis. With Hemschoot both co-producing and co-directing, it was published as a webseries on June 19, 2017.

In 2017, he directed and edited the three minute short animation Camping à la Bergman. As of 2018, he and Bridgers were co-directing and producing the narrative documentary around the life of World War II hero and photo-recon pilot John H. Ross, John Ross: American, with Travelin' Productions and Worker Studio developing. He also edited the project, which is an animated documentary.

Artistic influences
In an interview with Oxford American, Hemschoot stated that his film sensibility was formed by the works of Hal Ashby, John Sayles, Sam Peckinpah, George Roy Hill, and Walter Hill, and his later influences include Alfonso Cuarón, Lars von Trier, Alejandro González Iñárritu, and Walter Salles.

For a 2014 article, Hemschoot selected five animated performances that influenced him creatively: Bill Tytla's "Chernabog" from Fantasia and Stromboli from Pinocchio, Milt Kahl's "Shere Khan" from The Jungle Book, Glen Keane's "Professor Ratigan" from The Great Mouse Detective and John Lounsbery's "Tony" from Lady and the Tramp.

Filmography

See also
John H. Ross
Sean Bridgers
Barry Kooser
Worker Studio

References

External links
 
  Print interview with Hemschoot in Denver Business Journal
 John Ross: American – KEZW radio interview

1972 births
Date of birth missing (living people)
Living people
Animators from Colorado
Computer animation people
American animated film directors
Visual effects artists
Web series directors
Web series producers
California Institute of the Arts alumni
People from Parker, Colorado
Film directors from Colorado